Sergey Morozov (born June 14, 1989) is a Kazakhstani mixed martial artist who competes in the Bantamweight division of the Ultimate Fighting Championship. Morozov is the former M-1 Bantamweight Champion.

Background
Having played football since the age of seven years old, he enrolled in the Youth Sports School, studied there, played until the age of 17. Then, at the age of 17, he joined the Aktobe-Zhas team, which played in the First League. He played there for two seasons, before leaving because of character issues - uncompromising, nasty, fighting.

In December 2021, Morozov converted to Islam.

Mixed martial arts career

Early career

Starting his professional career in 2008, Morozov compiled a 16-4 record, spending most of his time on the Russian regional scene, with most off his bouts coming with M-1 Global Challenge, where he spent five years and is the former M-1 Bantamweight Champion. In his attempt for the championship against Movsar Evloev on February 22, 2018 at M-1 Challenge 88, losing by rear-naked choke in the third round. After winning the next three bouts, he captured the championship against Aleksandr Osetrov at M-1 Challenge 102, winning by TKO in the third round. He defended the title against Josh Rettinghouse at M-1 Challenge 105, winning the bout via unanimous decision.

Ultimate Fighting Championship
Morozov was initially scheduled to face Umar Nurmagomedov on October 24, 2020 at UFC 254, but Nurmagomedov pulled out due to an illness. The pairing was then rescheduled for UFC 257 on January 24, 2021. However, the bout was yet again rescheduled the second time on January 20, 2021 at UFC on ESPN: Chiesa vs. Magny. Morozov lost the fight via fight via submission in round two.

His second fight in UFC was scheduled on July 17, 2021, facing Khalid Taha at UFC on ESPN 26. He won the fight via unanimous decision.

Morozov faced Douglas Silva de Andrade on February 12, 2022 at UFC 271. After dominating the first round, Morozov was choked unconscious via a rear-naked choke submission in the second round. The bout earned the Fight of the Night bonus award.

Morozov faced Raulian Paiva on June 25, 2022, at UFC on ESPN 38. He won the fight via unanimous decision.

Morozov faced Journey Newson on December 17, 2022 at UFC Fight Night 216. He won the fight via unanimous decision.

Championships and accomplishments
Ultimate Fighting Championship
Fight of the Night (One time) 
M-1 Global
M-1 Bantamweight Championship (One time)
One successful title defense
MMAjunkie.com
2022 February Fight of the Month vs. Douglas Silva de Andrade

Mixed martial arts record

|-
|Win
|align=center|19–5
|Journey Newson
|Decision (unanimous)
|UFC Fight Night: Cannonier vs. Strickland
| 
|align=center|3
|align=center|5:00
|Las Vegas, Nevada, United States
|
|-
|Win
|align=center|18–5
|Raulian Paiva
|Decision (unanimous)
|UFC on ESPN: Tsarukyan vs. Gamrot
|
|align=center|3
|align=center|5:00
|Las Vegas, Nevada, United States
|
|-
|Loss
|align=center|17–5
|Douglas Silva de Andrade
|Technical Submission (rear-naked choke)
|UFC 271
|
|align=center|2
|align=center|3:24
|Houston, Texas, United States
|
|-
| Win
| align=center|17–4
| Khalid Taha
|Decision (unanimous)
|UFC on ESPN: Makhachev vs. Moisés 
|
|align=center|3
|align=center|5:00
|Las Vegas, Nevada, United States
|
|-
|Loss
|align=center|16–4
|Umar Nurmagomedov
|Technical Submission (rear-naked choke)
|UFC on ESPN: Magny vs. Chiesa
|
|align=center|2
|align=center|3:39
|Abu Dhabi, United Arab Emirates
|
|-
|Win
|align=center|16–3
|Josh Rettinghouse
|Decision (unanimous)
|M-1 Challenge 105
|
|align=center|5
|align=center|5:00
|Nur-Sultan, Kazakhstan
|
|-
|Win
|align=center| 15–3
|Aleksandr Osetrov
|TKO (punches)
|M-1 Challenge 102
|
|align=center|4
|align=center|1:40
|Astana, Kazakhstan
|
|-
|Win
|align=center|14–3
|Bakhytbek Duyshobay Uulu
|KO (punches)
|M-1 Challenge 100
|
|align=center|1
|align=center|4:15
|Atyrau, Kazakhstan
|
|-
|Win
|align=center|13–3
|Bair Shtepin
|Decision (unanimous)
|M-1 Challenge 98
|
|align=center|3
|align=center|5:00
|Chelyabinsk, Russia
|
|-
|Win
|align=center| 12–3
|Zaka Fatullazade
|TKO (punches)
|M-1 Challenge 95
|
|align=center|1
|align=center|4:31
|Nazran, Russia
|
|-
|Loss
|align=center| 11–3
|Movsar Evloev
|Technical Submission (rear-naked choke)
|M-1 Challenge 88
|
|align=center|3
|align=center|3:47
|Moscow, Russia
|
|-
|Win
|align=center| 11–2
|Luan Fernandes
|TKO (punches)
|M-1 Challenge 83 
|
|align=center| 2
|align=center| 4:48
|Kazan, Russia
|
|-
|Win
|align=center| 10–2
|Fabricio Sarraff
|Decision (unanimous)
|M-1 Challenge 76
|
|align=center|3
|align=center|5:00
|Nalchik, Russia
|
|-
|Loss
|align=center| 9–2
|Josh Rettinghouse
|KO (punches)
|M-1 Challenge 73
|
|align=center| 1
|align=center| 4:22
|Nazran, Russia
|
|-
|Win
|align=center|9–1
|Yoon Jin Lee
|Decision (unanimous)
|KZMMAF: Battle of Nomads 9
|
|align=center|3
|align=center|5:00
|Hwasun, South Korea
|  
|-
|Win
|align=center|8–1
|Rafael Dias
|Decision (unanimous)
|M-1 Challenge 69
|
|align=center|3
|align=center|5:00
|Targim, Russia
|
|-
|Loss
|align=center| 7–1
|Pavel Vitruk
|Decision (unanimous)
|M-1 Challenge 64
|
|align=center|3
|align=center|5:00
|Moscow, Russia
| 
|-
|Win
|align=center| 7–0
|Andy Young
|TKO (spinning backfist and punches)
|M-1 Challenge 59
|
|align=center| 2
|align=center| 3:50
|Astana, Kazakhstan
|
|-
|Win
|align=center| 6–0
|Zafar Salimov
|Submission (rear-naked choke)
|KZMMAF: Battle of Nomads 4
|
|align=center| 1
|align=center| N/A
|Khujand, Tajikistan
|
|-
|Win
|align=center| 5–0
|Bogar Klos
|TKO (punches)
|KZMMAF: Battle of Nomads 3
|
|align=center| 1
|align=center| 3:44
|Oral, Kazakhstan
|
|-
|Win
|align=center| 4–0
|Andranik Karapetyan
|Submission (rear-naked choke)
|Professional Combat Samb: Eurasian Economic Union
|
|align=center|1
|align=center|1:52
|Omsk, Russia
|
|-
|Win
|align=center| 3–0
|Rijirigala Amu
|TKO (knee and punches)
|M-1 Challenge 53
|
|align=center|2
|align=center|4:40
|Beijing, China
|
|-
|Win
|align=center| 2–0
|Mirat Bekishev
|KO (punches)
|Astana Fight Club 2
|
|align=center|2
|align=center|N/A
|Astana, Kazakhstan
|
|-
|Win
|align=center|1–0
|Andrey Mikhailov
|Submission
|Profi Mix Fight Championship 2
|
|align=center|1
|align=center|N/A
|Nizhny Novgorod, Russia
|

See also 
 List of current UFC fighters
 List of male mixed martial artists

References

External links 
  
 

1989 births
Living people
Kazakhstani male mixed martial artists
Bantamweight mixed martial artists
Ultimate Fighting Championship male fighters
People from Aktobe
Kazakhstani Muslims
Converts to Islam